New Zealand won 17 medals at the 1988 Summer Paralympics: 2 golds, 4 silver and 11 bronze medals.

See also
 New Zealand at the Paralympics

References

External links
 International Paralympic Committee
 Paralympics New Zealand

Nations at the 1988 Summer Paralympics
1988
Paralympics